Anthropologica is a biannual peer-reviewed academic journal and the official publication of the Canadian Anthropology Association, published by University of Victoria Libraries. It was established in 1955 and the editor-in-chief is Alexandrine Boudreault-Fournier (University of Victoria).

Abstracting and indexing
The journal is abstracted and indexed in:

References

External links

Online access at Project MUSE

Publications established in 1955
Biannual journals
English-language journals
Anthropology journals